Landon Cohen (born August 3, 1986) is a former gridiron football defensive tackle. He was most recently a member of the Ottawa Redblacks of the Canadian Football League (CFL). He was drafted by the Detroit Lions in the seventh round of the 2008 NFL Draft. He played college football at Ohio. He has also been a member of the Jacksonville Jaguars, New England Patriots, and Arizona Cardinals.

Early years
Cohen was born in Spartanburg, South Carolina to Carolyn Ragin and Charles Cohen. He played high school football at Spartanburg High School in Spartanburg, South Carolina, where he also lettered in track and field. In football, Cohen recorded 107 tackles, six sacks, and 28 quarterback pressures as a senior and earned all-state honors.

College career
After high school, Cohen attended Ohio University, where he played in 12 games as a true freshman in 2004, making three starts at nose guard. In 2005, he started all 11 games as a sophomore, finishing with 28 tackles and two quarterback pressures. As a junior in 2006, Cohen started all 14 games and tallied 40 tackles (including 14 for a loss), earning second-team All-Mid-American Conference honors. In 2007, as a senior, he started all 12 games, recording a career-high 59 tackles (12.5 for a loss) and 1.5 sacks, one forced fumble, two fumble recoveries. After the season, he again was named to the All-MAC second-team.

Professional career

Detroit Lions
Cohen was drafted by the Detroit Lions in the seventh round (216th overall) of the 2008 NFL Draft. He played in six games as a rookie, finishing with four tackles. In 2009, Cohen played in 14 games, starting four, recording 21 tackles on the season. He was waived by the Lions on September 4, 2010.

Jacksonville Jaguars
The Jacksonville Jaguars claimed Cohen off waivers on September 5, 2010. He played in two games for the Jaguars, recording two tackles, before being waived on November 9, 2010.

New England Patriots
Cohen was signed by the New England Patriots on December 22, 2010. He played in the final two games of the season for the Patriots, starting one and recording three tackles. He was waived on September 3, 2011. Cohen was re-signed by the Patriots on September 21, 2011, but was waived on September 27.

Seattle Seahawks
On September 4, 2011, the Seattle Seahawks claimed him off waivers, but he was waived on September 10.

Dallas Cowboys
On July 25, 2013, Cohen was signed by the Dallas Cowboys.  He was waived on September 16, 2013.

Chicago Bears
On September 27, 2013, Cohen was signed by the Chicago Bears.

Buffalo Bills
Cohen was signed by the Buffalo Bills on July 21, 2014. The Bills released Cohen on August 29, 2014.

Seattle Seahawks
Cohen was signed by the Seattle Seahawks on January 5, 2015, adding him to their 53-man roster for the divisional playoff round.

Personal life
Cohen is also a part owner of a valet service called "The Valet, LLC" in Spartanburg, SC and works there when he is not playing football.

Married summer of 2019

References

External links
Chicago Bears bio
New England Patriots bio
Ohio Bobcats bio

1986 births
Living people
Sportspeople from Spartanburg, South Carolina
Players of American football from South Carolina
American football defensive tackles
American football defensive ends
Ohio Bobcats football players
Detroit Lions players
Jacksonville Jaguars players
New England Patriots players
Seattle Seahawks players
Dallas Cowboys players
Chicago Bears players
Buffalo Bills players
Ottawa Redblacks players